Leona Naess is a 2003 self-titled album by Leona Naess. Leona Naess is Naess' third album, and the first of hers to be produced Geffen Records. The album was a critical success, receiving a four and a half star ranking from Allmusic, and was chosen as one of Allmusics Album Picks. One of the tracks, Christmas, also appeared on the Music from the OC: Mix 3, and the album reached 43 on the TopHeatseekers chart in 2003.

A promotion-only version of the album packaged with its commercial release included a bonus DVD featuring interviews with Leona and footage of the recording sessions. The package also included a heart-shaped metal locket, a pressed leaf and a pencil sketch of Leona. The main album is also part of the package although a slightly different master with a different track order.

"Calling" was released as a single from this album. It was announced in December 2006 that "Ballerina" was re-recorded with Tori Amos producing and providing piano for a possible future single release.

Track listing
All songs written by Leona Naess except as indicated.

"Calling" – 3:45
"Don't Use My Broken Heart" – 3:51
"He's Gone" – 4:15
"Star Signs" – 4:52
"Ballerina" – 4:48 (Naess, Ethan Johns, Richard Causon)
"Dues to Pay" – 5:05
"Yes, It's Called Desire" – 3:22
"How Sweet" – 3:57
"Home" – 3:44
"Christmas" – 3:43
"One Kind of Love" – 3:56

References

2003 albums
Leona Naess albums
Albums produced by Ethan Johns
Geffen Records albums